The Maid is a 1990 made for TV film directed by Ian Toynton in which Anthony Wayne (Martin Sheen) goes to Paris for a new job and has a 30-day period before he starts work to get settled.

Cast
 Martin Sheen as Anthony Wayne
 Jacqueline Bisset as Nicole Chantrelle
 Victoria Shalet as Marie
 Jean-Pierre Cassel as C. P. Olivier
 James Faulkner as Laurent Leclair
 Isabelle Guiard as Nicole's secretary
 Dominic Gould as Pierre Meyer

External links 
 

1991 films
Maids in films
1991 romantic comedy films
American romantic comedy films
Films directed by Ian Toynton
1990s English-language films
1990s American films